Ulrik Frederik Gyldenløve, Count of Laurvig (20 July 1638 – 17 April 1704) was Governor-general of Norway (Stattholdere i Norge) from 1664–1699.
He was the leading general in Norway during the Scanian War, whose Norwegian leg is conventionally named the  Gyldenløve War after him.

Early life
Gyldenløve was born in Bremen, Germany, the illegitimate son of Prince Frederick, later King Frederick III of Denmark, who was at the time Prince-Archbishop of Bremen and coadjutor of the Bishopric of Halberstadt. His mother was Margrethe Pape, (1620–1684) who was made Baronesse of Løvendal by King Christian IV on September 15 that same year. When his father became King of Denmark-Norway in 1648, Ulrik Frederik assumed the surname Gyldenløve which was used by illegitimate sons of Danish kings.

During the first half of the 1650s, he traveled in Europe, visiting France, Italy and Spain. He attended the University of Siena in 1654 and in Rome in 1655.
On 21 August 1655 he became a naturalised Danish noble.

Military career
In 1661, he was put in charge at Vordingborg and  appointed commander Kalø Castle in Århus. 
In 1657 he became colonel in Norway. Gyldenlove participated in the Dano-Swedish War (1658–1660), where he distinguished himself in the Battle of Nyborg on 14 November 1659.

Civil career and holdings in Norway
In 1664 Gyldenløve was appointed  viceroy  (Statholder) of Norway, replacing Iver Krabbe (1602- 1666). He studied conditions in Norway very carefully, and became a strong advocate for many important reforms, such as a simplified tax system and the establishment of a Court of appeals in Norway separate from the one in Denmark. He is also remembered for his role in the construction and improvement of nine fortresses along the Swedish border.
 
Gyldenløve took part in the 17th-century Dano-Swedish wars where he was particularly successful at the Battle of Nyborg on 14 November 1659. In 1666, he became commander-in-chief of the Norwegian army which was victorious in the Scanian Wars (1675–1679).

Gyldenløve implemented the reforms initiated by the prior Governor-general Hannibal Sehested  (1609–1666) effecting taxation, defence and justice and protection for tenant farmers. He was also active in Danish politics from 1670 in association with Peder Griffenfeld (1635–1699) who served as Chancellor of Denmark.

In 1671, Gyldenløve founded the city of Laurvig (modern-day Larvik), and was named Count of Laurvig. In Larvik, he is remembered for the construction of Larvik Church (Larvik kirke), its main church as well as Laurvig Manor House (Laurvig   Herregården), which is still one of the largest wooden structures in Norway. Larvik Church was inaugurated in 1677. Gyldenløve issued a gift  to the church where the interest on the capital was to be used for maintenance.  Laurvig Manor House  was built  beginning in 1674 and was completed for his third wedding with Antoinette Augusta von Aldenburg in 1677.

Gyldenløve Chamber
The site of Gyldenløve Chamber in Copenhagen, later to be known as Charlottenborg Palace (Charlottenborg Slot), was donated by King Christian V of Denmark to his half brother Ulrik Frederik Gyldenløve on 22 March 1669 in connection with the establishment of Kongens Nytorv. Gyldenløve built his new mansion from 1672 to 1683 as the first building on the new square.

Family
Count Ulrik Frederik married three times: His first married 1659 Sophie Urne (1629-1714), daughter of Jørgen Urne and Margrete Marsvin, who he had to leave for his second Marriage with Marie Grubbe (1643–1718) 1660, from whom he was divorced after nine years in 1670. His third wife was Countess Antoinette Augusta von Aldenburg (1660-1701), eldest daughter of Anton I, Count von Aldenburg und Knyphausen (by his first wife, Countess Auguste Johanna zu Sayn-Wittgenstein-Hohenstein), legitimated son of Anton Gunther, who belonged to the Delmenhorst cadet branch of the House of Oldenburg whose senior line became hereditary kings of Denmark. Ulrik Frederik's two first marriages ended in divorces, but he has descendants from the first and third.

He had many children, both legitimate and illegitimate, four of whom lived to adulthood, married and left descendants:

By Sophie Urne:
Woldemar Gyldenløve (1660–1740), later Baron of Lowendal, father of German officer and statesmen Ulrich Frédéric Woldemar, Comte de Lowendal (1700–1755)
Carl Løvendal (1660-1689), committed suicide on a ship near the island Saint Thomas in the Danish West Indies)

By Countess Antoinette Augusta von Aldenburg:
Countess Charlotte Amalie af Danneskiold-Samsøe (1682-1699), wed Christian Gyldenløve (1674-1703), an illegitimate son of Christian V of Denmark
Ulrikke Amalie Antoinette af Danneskiold-Samsøe (1686-1755), wed Count Carl von Ahlefeldt (1670–1722) 
Ferdinand Anton Danneskiold-Laurvig, Count af Danneskiold-Samsøe (1688-1754), wed Countess Ulrikke Eleonore af Reventlow (1690-1754)

Through his daughter, Charlotte Amalie, and her daughter, Countess Frederikke Louise af Danneskiold-Samsø , Ulrik Frederik became the ancestor of the Dukes of Augustenborg and thus, among others, of Frederick VIII, Duke of Schleswig-Holstein and the German Empress Augusta.

See also
 Gyldenløve

References

Other sources
A History of Norway by Karen Larson, (Princeton University Press) 1948
The History of the Norwegian People by Knut Gjerset, (MacMillan) 1915
Ulrik Frederik Gyldenløve by Otto von Munthe af Morgenstierne	(København, E. Munksgaard)   1944

External links
 Larvik Herregården   website
Larvik kirke website

Danish diplomats
Larvik
Governors-general of Norway
Illegitimate children of Danish monarchs
Politicians from Copenhagen
Nobility from Copenhagen
17th-century Danish nobility
17th-century Norwegian military personnel
1704 deaths
1638 births
People of the Scanian War
Sons of kings